Oroville is a former train station in Oroville, California. The building was constructed in 1910 as the town's stop along the Western Pacific Railroad Feather River Route. The railroad discontinued their passenger trains in 1970, leaving Oroville without rail services. The Chico Electric Railway had built an electric interurban railway line to the town with a route down High Street and its own depot two blocks west of the Western Pacific's.

The station was converted to a restaurant after being sold by the WP. A steak house opened in 1977, called The Depot, which would go on to be converted to a brewpub in 2007: Western Pacific Brewing and Dining. By 2017, with the building up for sale, the Butte County Association of Governments had plans to redevelop the facility as a commuter bus station, but were unable to secure funding.

References

Oroville, California
Former Western Pacific Railroad stations
Railway stations in the United States opened in 1910
Railway stations closed in 1970
Repurposed railway stations in the United States
Railway stations in Butte County, California
Former railway stations in California